Wildest Dreams is the ninth solo studio album by Tina Turner, released on April 22, 1996, by Parlophone and Virgin Records (U.S.). It has earned double platinum certifications in the United Kingdom and in Europe.

Overview
The album includes the song "GoldenEye", the theme to the James Bond film of the same name. It was written by Bono and The Edge of the Irish band U2 and was recorded and released as a single in 1995. The song "Confidential" was written and co-produced for Turner by the British group Pet Shop Boys. The band's singer and lyricist, Neil Tennant, sings backing vocals on the track.  The original Pet Shop Boys demo (with Tennant on vocals) can be found on the 2001 2-disc re-release of their album Very. "Unfinished Sympathy" is a cover of the Massive Attack song. The track "All Kinds of People" was co-written by Sheryl Crow. "In Your Wildest Dreams" was later re-recorded as a duet with Barry White and released as a single, reaching No. 32 in the UK Singles Chart. The duet version is included on the U.S. version of the album, which has a different track listing, released some six months after it was first issued in Europe and most other parts of the world, and features an alternate cover. The album also features guest vocals from Sting on the track "On Silent Wings" which peaked at No. 13 in the UK. Wildest Dreams includes a total of six European single releases; "GoldenEye", "Whatever You Want"—co-written by Taylor Dayne, "On Silent Wings", Turner's cover version of John Waite's "Missing You", "Something Beautiful Remains" and the title track "In Your Wildest Dreams".

In 1997 the album was released as a limited edition special pack in Europe with a bonus disc including remixes, non-album tracks and live recordings from Turner's concert in Amsterdam on the Wildest Dreams Tour. The two-disc edition was released with the same cover picture as the U.S. album.

Track listings

Personnel

 Tina Turner – lead vocals
 Sting – vocals
 Barry White – vocals (U.S. edition)
 Antonio Banderas – vocals
 Sheryl Crow – background vocals
 Anne Dudley – orchestra arrangements
 John Altman - string arrangements 
 Gavin Wright – orchestra leader
 C-n-A – guitar, keyboards
 Terry Britten – guitar, bass guitar, background vocals
 Trevor Rabin – guitar, background vocals
 Tim Pierce, J.J. Belle, Dominic Miller, David Rainger – guitar
 Chris "Snake" Davis, John Thirkell, Andy Hamilton, Steve Hamilton, Peter Thoms, Andy Bush – horns
 Charles Olins – piano
 Neil Tennant – keyboards, background vocals
 Chris Lowe, Lol Creme, Jamie Muhoberac, Toby Chapman, Garry Hughes, Richard Cottle – keyboards
 Reggie Hamilton, Andy Hess – bass guitar
 Keith LeBlanc, Graham Broad, Eric Ansten, Richie Stevens, Mike Higham – drums
 Trevor Horn – background vocals
 Tessa Niles – background vocals
 Lisa Fischer – background vocals
 Miriam Stockley – background vocals
 Conner Reeves – background vocals
 The Durham Cathedral Choir – choir

Production
 Terry Britten – record producer, tracks 1 and 9
 Trevor Horn – producer, tracks 2 to 6, 10, 12
 Bono – executive producer, track 7
 The Edge – executive producer, track 7
 Nellee Hooper – producer, track 7
 Chris Porter – producer, track 8
 Pet Shop Boys (Chris Lowe and Neil Tennant) – producers, track 8
 Garry Hughes – producer, track 11
 Andres Levin and Camus Celli – producers on "The Difference Between Us" from an original production by Trevor Horn
 Tim Weidner – sound engineer
 Brian Tench – sound engineer
 Chris Porter – sound engineer

Charts

Weekly charts

Year-end charts

Certifications and sales

Release history

References

Tina Turner albums
1996 albums
Albums produced by Trevor Horn
Parlophone albums
Soft rock albums by American artists